Rodolphe Saadé (born 3 March 1970) is a Franco-Lebanese businessman. He is the chairman of the CMA CGM Group, a world leader in logistics transport, and the son of its founder, Jacques Saadé. As of April 2022, his net worth was estimated at US$41.4 billion.

Biography 
Rodolphe Saadé was born on 3 March 1970 in Lebanon, the son of Jacques Saadé. His Lebanese mother Naila Saadé (née Salem) was born in Beirut and is the sister of Farid Salem, co-founder of CMA CGM. After studying business at Concordia University in Montreal, he started his own water cooler company in Lebanon, Dynamic Concept. President and CEO of this distribution company, he acquires a first experience in international trade in Lebanon and Syria.

He put this experience to good use by working for the CMA CGM Group, headed by his father, which he joined in 1994. He first held positions in New York and Hong Kong, then returned to the Group's head office in Marseille, where he took on increasingly important responsibilities between 1997 and 2004.

From 1997 to 2000, Rodolphe Saadé was successively Director of the United States - Mediterranean - Far East - Northern Europe and Far East - Northern Europe - U.S. West Coast lines.

Appointed Director of the Transatlantic and Transpacific line in 2000, he became Vice President of the same line in 2002.

In 2004, Rodolphe Saadé became General Manager and is in charge of developing the regular lines of the North-South Axis to North America, Central America, the Caribbean, South and West Africa, Australia and the Indian Ocean.

In 2006, following the takeover of Delmas by CMA-CGM in 2005, Rodolphe Saadé is leading the development of Delmas' lines in West, East and Central Africa and the Indian Ocean, and will make it an efficient and profitable maritime operator.

In 2008, Rodolphe Saadé invested in the development of services to Africa and the Indian Ocean, following which, he took over the management of Delmas, dedicated to African lines. That year, he played a key role in managing the hostage-taking of a Compagnie du Ponant cruise ship. He led the discussions with the kidnappers and helped to free the victims unharmed.

Two years later, he became Vice Chairman and member of the Board of Directors of the CMA CGM Group.

In November 2017, Rodolphe Saadé is appointed Chairman and CEO of the CMA CGM Group.

In April 2018, under the leadership of Rodolphe Saadé, the Group took a 25% stake in Ceva Logistics at the time of its initial public offering. One year later, CMA CGM launched a public takeover bid for the company. With this acquisition, CMA CGM creates a global transport and logistics group. Rodolphe Saadé transfers CEVA Logistics headquarters from Switzerland to France, creating 200 jobs. He inaugurates it in November 2019, in the presence of French Prime Minister Edouard Philippe.

In August 2018, Rodolphe Saadé creates a start-up incubator in Marseille, called Zebox, in partnership with Accenture, BNP Paribas, EY, the forwarding agent Centrimex, the logistics specialist Ceva.

In August 2019, at the G7 meeting, Rodolphe Saadé announces his commitment to ensure that his container ships do not use the Northeast passageway, commonly known as the "Northern Route" and made accessible by global warming, in order to protect the biodiversity of the Arctic zone and to fight against global warming.

In September 2019, the world's first LNG-powered container ship is launched.

In March 2020, Rodolphe Saadé announced that CMA CGM was offering 200,000 FFP2 protective masks to France Health Agency to fight against the COVID-19 virus.

Key dates 
- 1970: Birth in Lebanon ;

- 1993: Founder and CEO of Dynamics Concept;

- 1994: Start of his career at CMA in New York;

- 1995: Line Manager Northern Europe - Far East in Hong Kong;

- 1997: Director of the United States-Mediterranean line in Marseille;

- 1998: Line Director, Far East-Northern Europe in Marseille;

- 1999: Line Manager, Far East-Northern Europe/U.S. West Coast in Marseille;

- 2000: Line Manager, Transat and Transpacific in Marseille;

- 2002: Vice-President of the Transat and Transpacific line in Marseille;

- 2004: General Manager of the CMA-CGM Group;

- 2006: Development of the Delmas lines in West, East and Central Africa and the Indian Ocean and the implementation of synergies between the Delmas, CMA-CGM Group and Cross Trade lines;

- 2007: Leading of the acquisition of US Lines company;

Awards 
- Knight of the French Legion of Honor (2017)

Personal life
Saadé resides in Marseille, France.

References

1970 births
Living people
Concordia University alumni
Businesspeople from Marseille
French billionaires
French people of Lebanese descent
French chief executives